Interstate 275 (I-275) is an  highway in Ohio, Indiana, and Kentucky that forms a complete beltway around the Cincinnati metropolitan area and includes a part in a state (Indiana) not entered by the parent route. It had been the only auxiliary Interstate that enters three states, but that changed in July 2018 when I-295 in Delaware and New Jersey was extended into Pennsylvania. It is also the third longest beltway overall in the United States—only the Sam Houston Tollway and the Grand Parkway encircling Greater Houston are longer. For a short distance in northwest Hamilton County, it overlaps with I-74 and US Route 52 (US 52).

I-275 is also known as the Cincinnati Bypass and officially known as the Donald H. Rolf Circle Freeway in Ohio, after a state senator, but locals rarely use these names, instead simply referring to it as "275" or "the loop". In 2011, Kentucky named its segment the Ronald Reagan Highway, not to be confused with Ronald Reagan Cross County Highway across the river in Cincinnati. The section in Clermont County is also designated as the Staff Sergeant Matt Maupin Veterans Memorial Highway.

Route description

I-71/I-75 to Indiana 

I-275 heads west toward Indiana, passing by Cincinnati/Northern Kentucky International Airport, with Kentucky Route 212 (KY 212) used as the service road to and from the airport. Then, near Hebron, west of the airport, I-275 has an interchange with KY 237, before passing over the Ohio River into Indiana.

Indiana 
In Indiana, I-275 passes through a rural area with only one interchange at US 50/State Road 1 (SR 1). I-275 heads northeast toward Ohio; at the Ohio state line, I-275 passes over US 50.

Ohio 

I-275 heads northeast toward Springdale, and I-275 runs concurrently with I-74 and US 52. When the concurrency ends, I-275 has an intersection with State Route 126 (SR 126, Ronald Reagan Cross County Highway). Then, I-275 has interchanges with US 27 and US 127. I-275 turns east, having an interchange with SR 4, SR 747, I-75, and US 42. I-275 turns southeast, having an interchange with I-71 and US 22/SR 3. I-275 passes over the Little Miami River, entering Clermont County, where it is officially named in honor of Keith Matthew Maupin, a local soldier killed during the Iraq War. I-275 turns due south toward Milford and connects with SR 28, SR 450, SR 32, and SR 125. I-275 turns due west toward Kentucky, passing through a short concurrency with US 52, before crossing over the Ohio River into Kentucky.

Ohio to I-71/I-75 
From Ohio, I-275 heads southwest toward Highland Heights. I-275 has an interchange with I-471 near Highland Heights. I-275 turns due west toward Crestview Hills, passing through an interchange with KY 9, KY 16, and KY 17. In Crestview Hills, I-275 has an interchange with US 25/US 42/US 127. I-275 turns northeast toward I-71/I-75.

History

I-74/I-275 bridge crash 
On May 20, 2008, a tractor-trailer hauling a locomotive separated while traveling on the ramp from westbound I-74 to southbound I-275. After the trailer detached, it crashed into supports for the bridge on I-74 eastbound going over the ramps between I-275 and I-74 westbound. As a result, the Ohio Department of Transportation (ODOT) shut down eastbound I-74 for several weeks. Both ramps between I-74 west and I-275 were closed as well because of fears the bridge would collapse, but two crossovers were built so that traffic could use one lane of westbound I-74 to travel east around the damaged bridge.

Exit list

References

External links 

I-275 on Cincinnati-Transit.net

2 Ohio
75-2
75-2
75-2
75-2 Ohio
Roads in Cincinnati
275
Transportation in Hamilton County, Ohio
Transportation in Clermont County, Ohio
Transportation in Campbell County, Kentucky
Transportation in Kenton County, Kentucky
Transportation in Boone County, Kentucky
Transportation in Dearborn County, Indiana
Cincinnati metropolitan area